The 1927–28 Divizia A was the sixteenth season of Divizia A, the top-level football league of Romania.

Participating teams

Final Tournament of Regions

Preliminary round

Quarters

Semifinals

1 The team from Sibiu failed to appear, so it lost the game with 0–3, by administrative decision.

Final
July 19, 1928, Braşov

Champion squad

References

Liga I seasons
Romania
1927–28 in Romanian football